Rutland is an unincorporated community in Harrison County, Kentucky, in the United States.

History
A post office was established at Rutland in 1852, and remained in operation until it was discontinued in 1904. Rutland was described in 1877 as a small village which contained a store, church and school.

References

Unincorporated communities in Harrison County, Kentucky
Unincorporated communities in Kentucky